The 2012 Sacramento mayoral election was held on June 5, 2012 to elect the mayor of Sacramento, California. It saw the reelection of Kevin Johnson. Since Johnson won a majority in the first round, no runoff was required.

Municipal elections in California are officially non-partisan.

Results

References 

2012 California elections
Mayoral elections in Sacramento, California
Sacramento